Bismaya Sport Club, is an Iraqi football team based in Baghdad, that plays in the Iraq Division Three.

Managerial history
 Salam Al-Magsousi
 Bahaa Hussein

See also
 2019–20 Iraq FA Cup
 2020–21 Iraq FA Cup

References

External links
 Bismaya SC on Goalzz.com
 Iraq Clubs- Foundation Dates

Football clubs in Iraq
2019 establishments in Iraq
Association football clubs established in 2019
Football clubs in Baghdad